Unamji Water's Edge Park is a park that is located in Daegu Buk-gu, South Korea.
Construction of the park started on November 18th 1997 and it opened on April 24th 1998.

The park covers an area of 17,962 m2.

References

External links
http://map.naver.com/local/siteview.nhn?code=19588937&type=spot

Parks in Daegu
Buk District, Daegu